Steven Van Slyke (born July 19, 1956) is an American chemist, best known for his co-invention of the Organic Light Emitting Diode (OLED) and his contributions to the commercial development of OLED displays. Van Slyke is currently the Chief Technology Officer at Kateeva, Inc.  Prior to joining Kateeva, he held various positions at Eastman Kodak and was involved in all aspects of OLED Technology, from basic materials development to implementation of full-color OLED display manufacturing.

Education and career
Steven Van Slyke received his BA degree in chemistry from Ithaca College and his MS degree in materials science from Rochester Institute of Technology.  He joined Eastman Kodak in 1979 as a Research Scientist and, together with Ching W. Tang, discovered key materials and thin-film device configurations leading to the demonstration of efficient Organic Light Emitting Diode structures.   Van Slyke is now the Chief Technology Officer at Kateeva, responsible for the implementation of proprietary ink-jet printing technologies for more efficient manufacturing of OLED displays.

Van Slyke's career at Kodak led to the discovery of new organic material and layer structures providing efficient and stable OLED devices as well as to the development of novel methods for high volume manufacturing of OLED displays.   In particular, Van Slyke identified metal chelate structures that provided emission with high durability across the visible spectrum, as well as key hole transporting materials useful for providing confinement of excited states within the OLED structure.   Van Slyke and his teams also developed linear deposition sources that are now used in high volume manufacturing of full color OLED displays and also introduced the RGBW (four sub-pixel) display configuration found in OLED TV's.   These accomplishments are described in over 40 U.S. patents and over 50 publications and presentations in the areas of electronic materials development, device architecture and manufacturing. 

At Kateeva, Van Slyke's responsibilities include the development of the company's inkjet display manufacturing technologies, with a focus on thin-film encapsulation and RGB pixel pattering of state of the art OLED displays, and identifying new inkjet business opportunities.

Awards 
 2018 – National Inventors Hall of Fame "in recognition of an innovation that has contributed to the nation's welfare and the progress of science and useful arts"
 2014 – Thomson Reuters Citation Laureate "for the invention of the organic light emitting diode"
 2013 – Consumer Electronics Hall of Fame "for pioneering work that led to the invention of the Organic Light-emitting Diode"
 2010 – Distinguished Alumni Award, Watertown High School “for the invention of a new display technology”
 2006 – Fellow of the Society for Information Display "for his pioneering work and many contributions to the science and technology of organic light-emitting-diode (OLED) displays"
 2004 – Eastman Kodak Research Fellow "for extraordinary contributions to the Eastman Kodak Company"
 2004 – American Chemical Society National Award for Team Innovation "for successfully moving an innovative idea to a product now in commercial use"
 2003 – Eastman Kodak Company Distinguished Inventors Gallery "for studies in the field of Organic Light Emitting Diodes"
 2002 – Rochester Inventor of the Year of the Rochester Intellectual Property Law Association "for outstanding contribution to the community and to the nation by promoting progress of the useful arts through invention and the use of the patent system"
 2001 – American Chemical Society Northeast Regional Industrial Innovation Award "for the invention and commercialization of a new display technology"
 2001 – Jan Rajchman Prize of the Society of Information Display "for pioneering contributions to the underlying science and technology of organic light-emitting diodes that lead to the commercialization of flat-panel OLED displays"
 2000 – Eastman Innovation Award, Eastman Kodak Company's highest award "in recognition of extraordinary innovative contributions leading to business success for Eastman Kodak Company"

Selected publications

References

Ithaca College alumni
American materials scientists
Kodak people
21st-century American chemists
Living people
1956 births
American people of Dutch descent